This was the first edition of the tournament.

Victor Vlad Cornea and Franko Škugor won the title after defeating Vladyslav Manafov and Oleg Prihodko 6–7(3–7), 6–2, [10–4] in the final.

Seeds

Draw

References

External links
 Main draw

Internazionali di Tennis Città di Rovereto - Doubles